La senda oscura (English title: The Dark Path) is a 1947 Argentine film, directed by Luis Moglia Barth and starring María Duval,  Elsa O'Connor and Ricardo Passano.

Cast
 María Duval …Julia
 Elsa O'Connor …Artea / Mercedes Quiroga
 Ricardo Passano …Carlos Quiroga
 Alberto Contreras …Dr. Esteban Vargas
 Alejandro Maximino … Menéndez
 César Fiaschi …Dr. González
 Pepito Petray …Antonio
 Alfonso Pisano …Hombre 1 en varieté
 Florén Delbene …Amante de Artea
 Mario Baroffio …Hombre 2 en varieté
 Martha Atoche …Gertrudis
 Adolfo Linvel …Dr. Norton
 Francisco Audenino
 Paul Ellis		
 Oscar Villa

See also
 List of Argentine films of 1947

References

External links
 

1947 films
1940s Spanish-language films
Argentine black-and-white films
Films directed by Luis Moglia Barth
1940s Argentine films